The South African Railways Class 34-800 of 1978 is a diesel-electric locomotive.

Between August 1978 and December 1979, the South African Railways placed fifty Class 34-800 General Motors Electro-Motive Division type GT26MC diesel-electric locomotives in service. In 1979 one more of the same type was placed in service by Iscor in Newcastle and between April and July 1980 a further eight of these locomotives were delivered to the South African Railways.

Manufacturer
The Class 34-800 type GT26MC diesel-electric locomotive was designed by General Motors Electro-Motive Division and built for the South African Railways (SAR) and Iscor by General Motors South Africa (GMSA) in Port Elizabeth. The first fifty were delivered between August 1978 and December 1979, numbered in the range from 34-801 to 34-850. In 1979, one more of the same type was placed in service by Iscor.

Distinguishing features

Of the GM-EMD Class 34 family of locomotives, Classes  and  locomotives are visually indistinguishable from one another, but they can be distinguished from the Class  by the thicker fishbelly-shaped sills on their left sides compared to the straight sill on the left side of the Class .

Rebuilding and modification

Class 39-000
The Class 39-000 type GT26CU-3 diesel-electric locomotives were to be rebuilt from Class ,  and  locomotives. The project commenced in 2005, using suitable frames from wrecked locomotives.

Rebuilding was done at the Transwerk shops in Bloemfontein between 2006 and 2008. It was intended to produce one hundred Class  but in spite of the technical success of the project, rebuilding was halted after completing the first five locomotives due to higher than anticipated cost. Two of these five were rebuilt from Class  locomotives. It was decided, instead of rebuilding old locomotives, to rather build fifty new Class  locomotives from imported and locally produced components.

Traction motor upgrade
In 2010, a project commenced at the Koedoespoort Transnet Rail Engineering shops to upgrade Class  locomotives by, amongst other modifications, replacing the GM-EMD D29B with GM-EMD D31 traction motors, thereby improving their performance to the standard of the Class . The upgraded locomotives could initially be distinguished by the running board mounted handrails which were installed on the right side only during the upgrade.

Service

South African Railways
In SAR, Spoornet and Transnet Freight Rail (TFR) service, the Class  worked on most mainlines and some unelectrified branchlines in the central, eastern, northern  and northeastern parts of the country.

National Railways of Zimbabwe
From at least 1988 until at least 1992, the National Railways of Zimbabwe (NRZ) hired type GT26MC Class  locomotives from the SAR and later Spoornet. At least one Class  locomotive, no. , also served on lease in Zimbabwe and was observed there in September 1992.

NLPI Limited
NLPI Limited, abbreviated from New Limpopo Projects Investments, a Mauritius-registered company, specialises in private sector investments by using the build-operate-transfer (BOT) concept. It had three connected railway operations in Zimbabwe and Zambia, which formed a rail link between South Africa and the Democratic Republic of Congo.
 The Beitbridge Bulawayo Railway (BBR), commissioned on 1 September 1999, operates the Beit Bridge to Bulawayo line in Zimbabwe.
 Since February 2004 NLPI Logistics (NLL or LOG) operates between Bulawayo and Victoria Falls on the Zimbabwe-Zambia border.
 Since February 2003 the Railway Systems of Zambia (RSZ) operated on the former Zambian Railways (ZR) from Victoria Falls to Sakania in the Congo.

These locomotives were sometimes marked or branded as either BBR or LOG or both, but their status, whether leased or loaned, was unclear since they were still on the TFR roster and still often worked in South Africa as well. Class  locomotives which served with NLPI include the locomotives annotated "NLPI" in the "disposition" column in the table below.

Zambia Railways, the state-owned holding company, resumed control of the Zambian national rail network on 11 September 2012. This followed the government's decision to revoke the operating concession awarded to RSZ after Finance Minister Alexander Chikwanda claimed that RSZ had "blatantly disregarded the provisions of the agreement" and had been "acting in a manner prejudicial to the interests of Zambians”.

Iscor
In 1979, one Class  locomotive was delivered new to Iscor's Newcastle steel works in Natal, numbered .

Works numbers
The works numbers of the Class  as well as their known disposal and deployment are displayed in the table.

Liveries
The Class 34-800 were all delivered in the SAR Gulf Red livery with signal red buffer beams, yellow side stripes on the long hood sides and a yellow V on each end. In the 1990s many of them began to be repainted in the Spoornet orange livery with a yellow and blue chevron pattern on the buffer beams. Some later received the Spoornet Traction maroon livery. In the late 1990s a few were repainted in the Spoornet blue livery with outline numbers on the long hood sides. After 2008 in the Passenger Rail Agency of South Africa (PRASA) era, at least one was repainted in the PRASA blue livery.

Illustration

References

3400
C-C locomotives
Co′Co′ locomotives
Co+Co locomotives
Electro-Motive Division locomotives
GMSA locomotives
Cape gauge railway locomotives
Railway locomotives introduced in 1978
1978 in South Africa